F-box and leucine rich repeat protein 15 is a protein that in humans is encoded by the FBXL15 gene.

References

Further reading